The Barrie-Collingwood Railway , commonly referred to as the BCRY, is a shortline railway operating between the towns of Innisfil and Utopia in south central Ontario, Canada.  The line was started in 1998 and runs on abandoned Canadian National (CN) trackage which was collectively purchased by the railway's namesake municipalities.  The BCRY continues to run under the ownership of the City of Barrie and is operated by Cando Rail Services Ltd., based in Brandon, Manitoba.

History

In 1996, the Canadian National Railway abandoned its Newmarket Subdivision from Bradford, Ontario to Ramara, Ontario, as well as its entire Meaford Subdivision which ran from Barrie to Collingwood (both parts of the former Northern Railway of Canada).  CN had plans to rip up its tracks; however, the City of Barrie and the Town of Collingwood stepped in to purchase the lines to maintain their rail infrastructures. Barrie purchased the remainder of the  Newmarket Subdivision, the Meaford Subdivision from Barrie to Utopia in Essa Township and the remainder of the abandoned Beeton Subdivision (originally the Hamilton and North-Western Railway) which runs south from Barrie to Innisfil and connects with the other two subs at the site of the former Allandale Yard in Barrie. Collingwood purchased the rest of the Meaford Subdivision from Utopia westward.

In 1998, the BCRY was created to service various customers in Innisfil, Barrie, Colwell, Angus, Stayner and Collingwood along the Beeton and Meaford Subdivisions. The line crosses the Canadian Pacific (CP) Mactier Subdivision at Utopia, where a small interchange yard was subsequently built using old rails and ties pulled up from Allandale Yard. This was necessary as the abandonment of the Newmarket Sub north and south of Barrie effectively isolated the line from the North American rail network. The yard is also where maintenance of way (MOW) equipment and the locomotive is stored when not in use. Transloading facilities are also located here for customers not directly rail served.  The yard has a storage capacity of 60 cars. The  Newmarket Subdivision is not used by the BCRY; it was purchased to preserve future GO Transit expansion north from Bradford, which re-opened in late 2007. It has since been sold to Metrolinx, the operators of GO Transit.

BCRY was used in the TV series Mayday for both the San Bernardino train disaster and the Hinton train collision

Decommissioning of Collingwood portion of line
As of July 15, 2011, the Town of Collingwood had decided to decommission its portion of the line due to financial reasons. It was costing taxpayers up to $425,000 annually to keep providing regular rail service to essentially one customer, the Canadian Mist distillery, while Amaizeingly Green in the same industrial lot used it only sporadically. The only other user was a farm supply company in Stayner that was well served by Ontario Highway 26. In 2018, The trackage between Utopia and Collingwood was sold to the County of Simcoe. The City of Barrie continues to operate the line east of the Utopia yard, serving Barrie, Essa Township and Innisfil.

Current status
Today the railway services only four customers in the Barrie area. They include Tag Environmental and Western Mechanical in Barrie, and Tarpin Lumber and Comet Chemical in Innisfil, effectively reducing it to a local shunting operation. The line's future could be in jeopardy unless new customers can be attracted, as operating costs consistently exceed revenues. As of January 2016, unused stretches of track are being leased for empty tank car storage, due to the slow down in the oil industry. This has led to community backlash, citing safety concerns and impact on property values.

Equipment and track
Currently, the BCRY has only one locomotive, an EMD Phase III GP9, #1001, which was formerly Ohio Central (OHCR) #94 and Baltimore and Ohio (B&O) #6594. Another GP9, #1000, was in the fleet until 2000, when it was transferred to the newly-created Orangeville-Brampton Railway (OBRY), another shortline which Cando operated until 2018.  BCRY also possesses various MOW equipment and a road railer.

The track is over a century old, though remains in satisfactory condition for the class of track. Speed is limited along the line due to the short length of each subdivision. Track speed is currently . Efforts are continuously made to improve the right of way, including tie and rail replacement and signal upgrades.  Between 2011 and 2018, all level crossings on the Meaford and Beeton Subdivisions (spurs excluded) have received signal upgrades. In 2013, the level crossing at Mapleview Avenue was removed during the street's widening and replaced with an overpass. Most of the abandoned track between Utopia and Collingwood remains intact, though some has been lifted. A multi-use trail has been constructed alongside it.

See also

 MacTier Subdivision
 North Simcoe Railtrail
 Barrie line
 List of Ontario railways

References

External links

 BCRY website (copy archived January 10, 2007)
 Barrie Collingwood Railway on City of Barrie site
 Cando Contracting
 Trainweb.org
 A history of the BCRY

Rail transport in Simcoe County
Ontario railways